Profit may refer to:

Business and law
 Profit (accounting), the difference between the purchase price and the costs of bringing to market
 Profit (economics), normal profit and economic profit
 Profit (real property), a nonpossessory interest in land
 Account of profits, a type of equitable remedy in law (also known as an accounting)

Arts, entertainment, and media
 Profit (magazine), a Canadian business magazine aimed at entrepreneurs
 Profit (TV series), an American TV series starring Adrian Pasdar

People 
 Joe Profit (born 1959), former American football player
 Laron Profit (born 1977), professional basketball player
 Richard Profit (born 1974), English mountaineer and adventurer
 Park "Profit" Joon-yeong, professional Overwatch player

Places
 Profit, United States Virgin Islands

See also
 Prophet (disambiguation)
 The Profit (disambiguation)